Bolitoglossa centenorum is a lungless salamander in the family Plethodontidae endemic to Guatemala.

Description
It has more slender and more elongated limbs and toes than B. rostrata, with which it was formerly confused. Bolitoglossa centenorum sports a dark dorsal stripe bordered by two narrow yellow dorsolateral stripes from the back of the eye to the hind limb. The ventral parts are moderately pigmented dark. Webbing is almost totally absent between the toes.

Distribution and habitat
Bolitglossa centenorum is known only from the type locality near San Mateo Ixtatán in the Sierra de los Cuchumatanes. Individuals of the type series were collected from under rotting logs.

References

centenorum
Endemic fauna of Guatemala
Amphibians of Guatemala
Amphibians described in 2010